The  honors achievement in all aspects of Japanese literary culture. It was named in honor of Kikuchi Kan. The prize is presented annually by the literary magazine Bungei Shunjū and the Society for the Promotion of Japanese Literature.

History
The original Kikuchi Kan Prize was proposed by Kikuchi as an award to honor the elders of the literary world. It was established in 1938. In keeping with the intent of the prize, the jury was made up of novelists aged 45 or younger, and recipients were novelists aged 46 or older. The prize lapsed after six years, but was revived in 1952 following Kikuchi's death. The range of recipients was enlarged to honor achievements in cinema, broadcasting, and other fields in contemporary literary culture. The jury meets in October to consider works published from September 1 of the previous year through August 31, and awards are announced in the December issue of Bungei Shunjū.

Select list of prizewinners
The list of prizewinners includes a range of individual and institutional honorees.

 Iwanami Shoten, 1953
 Yomiuri Shimbun, 1953
 Eiji Yoshikawa, 1953
 Asahi Shimbun, 1954
 Ihei Kimura, 1955
 Chikage Awashima, 1956
 Mainichi Shimbun, 1957
 NHK, 1959 
 Kan Shimozawa, 1962
 Donald Keene, 1962
 Kenichi Horie, 1963
 Oya Soichi, 1965
 Meiji Village Museum, 1966
 Yoshiya Nobuko, 1967
 Ishikawa Tatsuzō, 1969
 Matsumoto Seicho, 1970
 Ken Domon, 1971
 Toshiro Mayuzumi, 1971
 Mizukami Tsutomu, 1971
 Nagai Tatsuo, 1972
 Yoji Yamada, 1972
 Hideo Kobayashi, 1973
 Akira Yoshimura, 1973
 Masanori Hata, 1977
 Edward Seidensticker, 1977
 Edwin McClellan, 1994
 Hisashi Inoue, 1999
 Mitsumasa Anno, 2008
 Yoshiharu Habu, 2008
 Matsumoto Seicho Memorial Museum, 2008
 Eiji Mitooka, 2011
 Rieko Nakagawa and Yuriko Yamawaki, 2013
 Osamu Akimoto, 2016
 Yuzuru Hanyu, 2022

See also
 List of Japanese literary awards

References

External links
 

Japanese literary awards